Aida Edemariam is an Ethiopian-Canadian journalist based in the UK, who has worked in New York, Toronto and London. She was formerly deputy review and books editor of the Canadian National Post, and is now a senior feature writer and editor at The Guardian in the UK. She lives in Oxford. Her memoir about her Ethiopian grandmother, The Wife's Tale: A Personal History, won the Ondaatje Prize in 2019.

Biography
Aida was born to an Ethiopian father and a Canadian mother. She grew up in Addis Ababa, the capital of Ethiopia. She studied English literature at Oxford University and the University of Toronto.

In 2014 her then forthcoming memoir, The Wife's Tale: A Personal History – the story of Edemariam's Ethiopian grandmother, Yetemegnu – was awarded the Royal Society of Literature's Jerwood Award for a non-fiction work in progress.

Informed by the author's 70 hours of interviews and conversations in Amharic with Yetemegnu, The Wife's Tale received favourable critical on its publication in February 2018 by Fourth Estate/HarperCollins, with the reviewer for The Times finding it "enriching",  and Lucy Hughes-Hallett writing in the New Statesman: "To read The Wife's Tale is not just to hear about times past and (for a western reader) far away, but to be transported into them." Nilanjana Roy in The Financial Times described it as an "outstanding and unusual memoir" in which Edemariam traces a century of Ethiopian history through the life of her nonagenarian grandmother. Selecting it as one of "the best books by African writers in 2019", Samira Sawlani on African Arguments concluded: "Aida Edemariam has gifted the world a priceless insight into history through her grandmother's eyes."

Edemariam was awarded the Ondaatje Prize for The Wife's Tale in May 2019.

She is a contributor to the 2019 anthology New Daughters of Africa, edited by Margaret Busby.

References

External links
 Aida Edemariam page at The Guardian.

Living people
21st-century Canadian journalists
21st-century Canadian women writers
Alumni of the University of Oxford
Canadian people of Ethiopian descent
Canadian women journalists
Canadian women non-fiction writers
Ethiopian writers
The Guardian journalists
University of Toronto alumni
Year of birth missing (living people)